Benjamin Lincoln Robinson (November 8, 1864 – July 27, 1935) was an American botanist.

Biography
Robinson was born on November 8, 1864, in  Bloomington, Illinois. In 1887, he received an A.B. from Harvard. He married Margaret Louise Casson on June 29, 1887, and couple traveled to Europe. He studied plant anatomy with H. Solms-Laubach and completed his Dr.phil. at University of Strasbourg in 1889. They returned to the United States in the fall of 1890. Most of his career was Gray Herbarium curator and he died at his summer home in Jaffrey, New Hampshire on July 27, 1935.

Career
In 1891, Robinson became an assistant to Sereno Watson, the curator of Gray Herbarium at Harvard University. Upon Watson's death in 1892, Robinson was appointed to the curator position. In 1899, Robinson became the first Asa Gray Professor of Systematic Botany. He was the editor of the New England Botanical Club's journal Rhodora from 1899 to 1928. While at the Gray Herbarium, he began a long association with fellow botanist Jesse More Greenman.

Awards
1929—Centennial Gold medal of the Massachusetts Horticultural Society

Family 
Benjamin Lincoln Robinson was a brother of James Harvey Robinson (1868–1936), a historian, scholar, and educator.

References

External links

American botanists
1864 births
1935 deaths
People from Bloomington, Illinois
Harvard University alumni
University of Strasbourg alumni